Clifton Brown (born August 29, 1976) is a Canadian retired Light Heavyweight Muay Thai Kickboxer of Jamaican descent, who fought out of Toronto, Ontario. Clifton is the President/CEO of Warrior Caste Productions Inc. A production company which focuses on Martial Arts through athlete documentaries, and day-to-day operations of MuayThai Premier League (The MPL). He is the first Canadian in History to achieve the level of World Champion in the sport of MuayThai. Clifton is also the first ever Canadian National team head coach. During his competitive career, Clifton became World Champion five times holding titles with the IMF(1x), WMC(3x), and IKKC(1x).

During Clifton's competitive career, Clifton trained exclusively at Siam No.1 Muay Thai Academy, under the tutelage of Ajahn Suchart Yodkerepauprai. Clifton also trained with Yodtong Senanan, at Sityodtong Muay Thai Camp in Chonburi, Thailand.

He is the former host, and one of the recurring fighters, on Champions of Champions Elite on G4TV, and was to also appear as a team coach in season two of Mark Burnett's The Contender Asia "The Challenger"  which stopped production after its pilot episode was completed in Kuala Lumpur Malaysia in 2009. Clifton is also the creator, producer, and co-writer of the TV series, Into the Fire.

In April 2017, MuayThai Canada nominated Clifton Brown as Canada's first National team head coach.

Competitive Titles and Achievements

 2009 | WMC | World Super Light Heavyweight Champion
 2007 | WMC | World Super Light Heavyweight Champion
 2004 | IKKC | World Cruiserweight Champion
 2003 | WMC | World Super Light Heavyweight Champion
 2003 | WMC | Intercontinental Super Light Heavyweight Champion
 2001 | IMF | World Super Middleweight Champion
 1999 | CMTA | North American Light Heavyweight Champion
 1998 | CMTC | Canadian Super Middleweight Amateur Champion

Kickboxing record

See also
List of male kickboxers

External links
Into the Fire
The MuayThai Premier League
Official Clifton Brown site
Press
CBC Top Dog: The Science of Winning and Losing
Lotus Fitness and Thai Boxing

References

1976 births
Living people
Canadian male kickboxers
Light heavyweight kickboxers
Canadian sportspeople of Jamaican descent
Sportspeople from Toronto